"Crazy" is a song by American R&B/soul singer Miki Howard. Released in 1988, as the third single from Love Confessions. "Crazy" peaked to #38 on Billboard's Hot R&B Singles chart. The song was written and produced by Marc Gordon and Gerald Levert, of R&B group LeVert.

Track listings and formats
U.S. Vinyl, 7" Inch, 45 RPM single
"Crazy" (Album Edit) – 3:54
"In Too Deep" (Album Version) – 3:59

Charts

References 

1988 singles
Miki Howard songs
Atlantic Records singles
1987 songs
Songs written by Gerald Levert